Cyberattacks on Ukraine may refer to:
2015 Ukraine power grid hack, which caused outages
2016 Kyiv cyberattack, which caused another power outage
2017 Ukraine ransomware attacks
2022 Ukraine cyberattacks

 

Cyberwarfare
Hacking in the 2010s
Hacking in the 2020s
2017 crimes in Ukraine
2022 crimes in Ukraine
2015 crimes in Ukraine
Cyberattacks